The surname Marin is of Spanish language origin. In Spanish, it is spelled Marín, with an acute accent on the í.

Richard Anthony "Cheech" Marin (born July 13, 1946) is an American comedian, actor, musician, and activist. He gained recognition as part of the comedy act Cheech & Chong during the 1970s and early 1980s with Tommy Chong and as Don Johnson's partner, Insp. Joe Dominguez, on Nash Bridges. He has also voiced characters in several Disney films, including Oliver & Company, The Lion King, the Cars series, Coco and Beverly Hills Chihuahua.

Marin's trademark is his characters' strong Chicano accents, although Marin himself is not fluent in Spanish.

Early life
Marin was born on July 13, 1946 in South Los Angeles, California, to Mexican-American parents Elsa (née Meza) (1923-2010), a secretary, and Oscar Marin (1922-2015), a police officer for the LAPD. Marin was born with a cleft lip, which was surgically repaired. According to Marin, he identifies as Chicano; he speaks some Spanish and often uses it in his movies, but he is not fluent.

Marin's nickname "Cheech" is short for "chicharron", fried pork rind, which is a popular snack and ingredient in Latin American cuisine. In a 2017 NPR interview, Marin attributed the nickname to his uncle: "I came home from the hospital, I was like a couple of days old or something, my uncle came over and he looked in the crib and he said [in Spanish], 'Ay, parece un chicharrón.' Looks like a little chicharrón, you know?"

In 1955, Marin and his family moved to Granada Hills, California, and he attended primary school at St. John Baptist de la Salle Catholic School. Marin then went to high school at Bishop Alemany High School, during which he started to attend folk music events at the Ash Grove on Melrose Avenue as a teenager. Afterwards, he studied at California State University, Northridge (then known as San Fernando Valley State College), where he was a member of Phi Sigma Kappa. During his second semester at CSUN, he worked almost full-time at Nordskog Industries in Van Nuys, while enrolled more than full-time as a college student. It was also during this time that he was socially introduced to marijuana through his fraternity, a key feature in his later film career, in addition to becoming acquainted with Timothy Leary at a local Students for a Democratic Society event, who would become a lifelong friend. Graduating CSUN as a English major in 1968, soon after he auditioned to sing for Frank Zappa's side project Ruben and the Jets. Not being offered the gig during his audition, a day later Marin moved to Vancouver, British Columbia in order to evade the draft during the Vietnam War. Marin met his future comedic partner, Tommy Chong, in Calgary, Alberta.

Career

Comedy albums and films

As a part of the highly successful comedy duo Cheech & Chong, Marin participated in a number of comedy albums and feature film comedies in the 1970s and 1980s.  Tommy Chong directed four of their films while co-writing and starring in all seven with Marin.

Later films and television work
After Cheech & Chong disbanded in 1985, Marin starred in a number of films as a solo actor, most notably Born in East L.A., which was also his directorial debut, The Shrimp on the Barbie, Tin Cup, and Once Upon a Time in Mexico. He made a cameo appearance as a dockworker in Ghostbusters II. In 2004 he made his second appearance as a policeman, as "Officer Salino" in the film adaptation of John Grisham's holiday novel Skipping Christmas, under the title Christmas with the Kranks, starring Tim Allen and Jamie Lee Curtis. Marin appeared in the Fox sitcom Married... with Children as the voice of the Bundy's Briard dog, Buck; he voiced the character in three episodes: Look Who's Barking, Change for a Buck and Assault and Batteries.

Marin made the transition to full-time television work when he co-starred on the short-lived The Golden Girls spin-off The Golden Palace (1992–1993), and later with Don Johnson, Jaime P. Gomez, and Yasmine Bleeth in the police show Nash Bridges (1996–2001), in which they played San Francisco police-detective partners.  In recent years he has been active in playing supporting roles in films and performing voice overs for animated features. After appearing in a supporting role in Judging Amy, playing an independently wealthy landscape designer, Marin starred in the CBS sitcom Rob, with Rob Schneider.

Marin is a frequent collaborator of the director Robert Rodriguez, who has worked with Marin seven times; the last two installments of the Mexico trilogy, the Spy Kids trilogy, From Dusk Till Dawn and Machete. He provided his voice for several Disney animated films, most notably Tito the Chihuahua in Oliver & Company (1988), Banzai the hyena in The Lion King (1994), and Ramone in Cars (2006) and its sequels Cars 2 (2011) and Cars 3 (2017). He also played Pancho in The Cisco Kid (1994), and reprised the Banzai role in the video game Kingdom Hearts II.

Cheech appears in several episodes of AMC's Lodge 49"as El Confidente, a member of Lodge 55 in Mexico.

Children's music albums and related works
Marin has released two best-selling albums in the children's music genre, My Name is Cheech, the School Bus Driver (1992) and My Name is Cheech, The School Bus Driver "Coast to Coast" (1997).  Both albums were released bilingually. In July 2007, the book Cheech the School Bus Driver was released, written by Marin, illustrated by Orlando L. Ramirez, and published by HarperCollins.

In 2005, Marin lent his voice to the animated children's series Dora the Explorer. He appeared in the episode "A Crown for King Juan el Bobo", as the Puerto Rican folk hero Juan Bobo.

Additional television appearances
In late 2006, Marin participated in Simon Cowell's Celebrity Duets, having sung with Peter Frampton, Randy Travis, Clint Black, Aaron Neville, and Al Jarreau.  He was the fourth to be eliminated.

Marin had a recurring role in the hit television series Lost, playing David Reyes, Hurley's father.

He was a co-host for WWE Raw on March 1, 2010, with his comedy partner Tommy Chong, in Oklahoma City.

Marin also sings on the hidden track "Earache My Eye" on Korn's album Follow the Leader.

In 2009, he appeared in the Hallmark Channel movie Expecting a Miracle.

On March 18, 2010, Marin beat journalist Anderson Cooper and actress Aisha Tyler on Celebrity Jeopardy!'''s Million Dollar Celebrity Invitational. Cooper admitted he was "crushed" by Marin. Marin also won his semifinal round early May but lost in the May 6–7 final to Michael McKean. He had previously won the first Celebrity Jeopardy! tournament in 1992.

In January 2012, he was one of eight celebrities participating in the Food Network reality series Rachael vs. Guy: Celebrity Cook-Off. He was eliminated in the third week of the competition.

The Cheech Marin Center for Chicano Art, Culture & Industry
Marin is an avid collector of Chicano art and started his collection in the 1980s. Two national touring exhibitions have featured works from his private collection. He feels that it's important to "use his celebrity status to call attention to what he saw as an under-appreciated and under-represented style of art". In collaboration with the city of Riverside, California, and the Riverside Art Museum, Marin established The Cheech Marin Center for Chicano Art, Culture & Industry, in the City of Riverside, which opened June 18, 2022. Marin will be donating his collection of over 700 pieces of Chicano art, the largest collection of such art in the world. The center will provide a location for the presentation and study of Chicano art, and is expected to draw international attention.

Other interests
He is an avid golfer, although he initially disliked the sport until he co-starred in the golf-themed comedy Tin Cup. Marin also practices horse archery on a special course built on his private land. 

On April 19, 2018, Cheech (as part of GLE Brands Inc) signed an agreement with Heritage Cannabis Holdings Corporation (CSE: CANN) to have exclusive rights to use cannabis and cannabis-related products utilizing the Private Stash brand throughout Canada for a period of 2 years, with the agreement automatically renewing for an additional year upon achieving various milestones.

Personal life
Marin was married in 1975 to Darlene Morley, who co-produced Cheech & Chong's The Corsican Brothers and also played minor roles in earlier Cheech & Chong films under the name Rikki Marin.  The couple had one child and divorced in 1984. Marin married artist Patti Heid in 1986; they had two children and have since divorced. Marin married his longtime girlfriend, Russian pianist Natasha Marin, on August 8, 2009, in a sunset ceremony at their home.

Marin resides in Malibu, California.

Filmography

Film

Television

Video gamesAnimated Storybook: The Lion King (1994) - Banzai (voice)Blazing Dragons (1996) - Sir George / Guido the Pizza Chef / Loudmouth GuardKingdom Hearts II (2006) - Banzai (voice)Cars (2006) - RamoneCars Mater-National Championship (2007) - RamoneCars Race-O-Rama (2009) - RamoneCars 2 (2011) - RamoneKinect Rush: A Disney-Pixar Adventure (2012) - RamoneDisney Infinity (2013) - RamoneCars: Fast as Lightning (2014) - Ramone

Theme park attractionsIt's Tough to Be a Bug! (1998) - ChilicRadiator Springs Racers (2012) - Ramone

Discography
 Cheech and Chong (1971)
 Big Bambu (1972)
 Los Cochinos (1973), won Best Comedy Recording at the 16th Annual Grammy Awards
 Cheech & Chong's Wedding Album (1974)
 Sleeping Beauty (1976)
 Up in Smoke (1978)
 Let's Make a New Dope Deal (1980)
 Get Out Of My Room (1985)My Name Is Cheech the School Bus Driver (Released October 27, 1992)
 Follow the Leader'' (1998)

Books

References

External links

 
 
 

1946 births
20th-century American comedians
21st-century American comedians
20th-century American male actors
21st-century American male actors
American art collectors
American cannabis activists
American male actors of Mexican descent
American male comedians
American male film actors
American male television actors
American male voice actors
American male screenwriters
American male video game actors
California State University, Northridge alumni
Comedians from California
Grammy Award winners
Hispanic and Latino American male actors
Living people
Male actors from Los Angeles
Screenwriters from California
Art museum people